"Que Tire Pa Lante" (contraction of "Que Tire para Alante", syncopic form of "Que Tire para Adelante") (English: "Pull Forward") is a song by Puerto Rican rapper Daddy Yankee and was released through El Cartel Records on October 18, 2019. The song features cameos by fellow artists Anuel AA, Bad Bunny, Darell, Natti Natasha, Wisin and Lennox. It samples "A Who Seh Me Dun" by Cutty Ranks (1996).

Background and promotion
Yankee announced the song and revealed the cover art on his social media on October 17, 2019. He described it as a reggaeton record out of 1970s in combination with the year 5000. He went on to post several videos teasing the song in the next hours. Yankee promised the song to be a "global hit" upon release. On October 17, the rapper performed the song on the Latin American Music Awards of 2019 in Los Angeles. Jessica Roiz of Billboard described the track as a combination of "old-school reggaeton and ‘90s dembow beat".

Music video
A music video for "Que Tire Pa Lante" was released through Daddy Yankee's YouTube channel on October 18, 2019 and was directed by Marlon Peña. It shows Yankee and several other people invading a desert town and having a street dance competition.

Charts

Weekly charts

Year-end charts

Certifications

See also
 List of Billboard Argentina Hot 100 number-one singles of 2019
List of Billboard number-one Latin songs of 2019
List of Billboard number-one Latin songs of 2020

References

2019 songs
2019 singles
Daddy Yankee songs
Spanish-language songs
Songs written by Daddy Yankee
Argentina Hot 100 number-one singles